Rosa 'Livin' Easy',  (aka HARwelcome), is a floribunda rose cultivar, bred by Jack Harkness. It was introduced into the United States by Weeks Roses in 1992 as 'Fellowship'. The rose was named an All-America Rose Selections winner in 1996.

Description
'Livin' Easy' is a medium bushy, upright shrub, 3 to 5 ft (91–151 cm) in height with a 3 to 4 ft (91–121 cm) spread. Blooms are 4—5 in (10–12 cm) in diameter,  with a petal count of 26 to 40. Bloom form is cupped, flat to cupped, and ruffled. Flowers are orange or an apricot-blend, displaying various shades of pink, apricot and orange, with unusual copper colored petal backs. Flowers also have dark pink petal edges and cream or yellow centers. Blooms have a moderate, citrus fragrance, and are generally borne singly, or in small clusters. The plant is vigorous,  blooming in flushes from spring through fall. The shrub has medium-sized, glossy, medium-green, dense, leathery foliage. The plant is prone tp blackspot and spiky prickles. It grows well in many climates, and is considered an ideal rose for massed plantings.

Sports and child plants
'Livin' Easy' was used to hybridize the following rose varieties:
 Rosa 'Bon Appetit', (2013) 
  Rosa 'Easy Going', sport, (1996)
 Rosa 'Emma Haftl', (2014) 
 Rosa 'Honey Nectar', (2001) 
 Rosa 'Hot Cocoa', (2002)

Awards
 Royal National Rose Society (RNRS) Gold Medal, (1990)
 All-America Rose Selections (AARS) winner, USA, (1996)

See also
Garden roses
Rose Hall of Fame
List of Award of Garden Merit roses

Notes

References

Livin' Easy